Bizionia is a strictly aerobic genus from the family of Flavobacteriaceae which produce carotenoids. Bizionia is named after Bartolomeo Bizio.

References

Further reading 
 
 
 
 

Flavobacteria
Bacteria genera